In Russia, the original series and films from Disney Channel, as well as Disney's other animated TV productions, are currently broadcast on Channel One and STS.

Disney launched a version of Disney Channel in Russia on August 10, 2010, by replacing Jetix.

Programmes dubbed in Russian
101 Dalmatian Street
Adventures of the Gummi Bears
Aladdin
A.N.T. Farm
Bonkers
Chip and Dale Rescue Rangers
Darkwing Duck
DuckTales
Goof Troop
Gravity Falls
The Little Mermaid
The New Adventures of Winnie the Pooh
Phineas and Ferb
Quack Pack
Shake It Up
TaleSpin
Timon and Pumbaa
Hannah Montana
House of Mouse
Kim Possible
Lilo and Stitch
Mickey Mouse Clubhouse

References